Barin may refer to:

 Barin, Georgia, a place in Muscogee County, Georgia, United States
 Barin, Iran (disambiguation)
 Baren, Payzawat County or Barin, a town in Payzawat County, Kashgar Prefecture
 Barin Township, a township of Akto County, Kizilsu Kyrgyz Autonomous Prefecture, Xinjiang, China
 Barin Township, Kargilik County, a in Xinjiang
 Barin Township, Shule County, a in Xinjiang
 Deh Barin, a village in Fars Province, Iran
 Prince Barin, a character in the Flash Gordon stories

See also
 Baarin, a village in northern Syria
 Baarins, a Southern Mongol subgroup
 Baren (disambiguation)